Cabin Creek is a  tributary of the Susquehanna River in York County, Pennsylvania in the United States.

Cabin Creek joins the Susquehanna near the outskirts of East Prospect borough.

See also
List of rivers of Pennsylvania

References

External links
U.S. Geological Survey: PA stream gaging stations

Rivers of Pennsylvania
Tributaries of the Susquehanna River
Rivers of York County, Pennsylvania